Lego City Undercover: The Chase Begins is an open world action-adventure video game developed by TT Fusion, that was released on the Nintendo 3DS in April 2013. Unlike previous Lego titles developed by Traveller's Tales, which have been based on various licenses, the game is based on the Lego City brand and was published by Nintendo. It serves as a prequel to Lego City Undercover.

Plot
Two years before the events of Lego City Undercover, Chase McCain, a rookie cop working for the Lego City Police Department, has one objective in mind: to put the most wanted man, Rex Fury, in jail. To do that, he has to go to every region of the city to find the wanted man in question.

As far as story connections go, it was Chase who accidentally revealed that Natalia Kowalski, his girlfriend who previously worked as a news reporter turned out to be the secret witness in the Rex trial, which forced her to go under witness protection. As a result, Chase was eventually exiled from Lego City, but not before he attempted to fix his mistakes by pursuing Rex and the criminals that work for him. It also outlines how Chase managed to arrest Rex Fury. Furthermore, the game reveals that Mayor Gleeson, a character also featured in Lego City Undercover, was formerly the chief of police, and how Chief Dunby was just a deputy officer.

Development
The game was announced during Nintendo's press conference at E3 2011 on 7 June 2011 with the tentative name Lego City Stories. On 17 January 2013, the game was revealed to be Lego City Undercover: The Chase Begins, and that it would be a prequel to the Wii U game.

Reception

The game received "mixed" reviews according to the review aggregation website Metacritic. IGN called it a "decent" game that is marred by "a lot of fog, a lot of loading, no voice acting and a jarring framerate". In Japan, where the game was ported for release on 5 March 2015, Famitsu gave it a score of 32 out of 40.

Chris Scullion of Official Nintendo Magazine commented on the amount of cutbacks from the Wii U sequel (Undercover), stating that "The Chase Begins has far less funnier bones than Undercover. The silly jokes, clever spoofs and brilliant dialogue between the characters have been replaced with a handful of average cutscenes and loads of text-heavy dialogue which, while functional, are rarely amusing and never hilarious. Loading times were frustrating enough in LEGO City: Undercover but are even more infuriating here considering the game's running off a cartridge and is designed for handheld play. It's lacking visually, too. Thick fog (to hide having to render distant buildings) smothers the city and roads and pavements are far less crowded, making it feel like you're wandering around a post-apocalyptic LEGO City. The characters' faces don't move, making in-game cutscenes feel awkward and the frame rate is clunky if you're playing in 3D. It's technically impressive(ish), but not as fun or funny as the Wii U game."

Chris Vandergaag of Toronto Sun gave the game three-and-a-half stars out of five, saying that it "might have too many imperfections to be the standout masterwork its console big brother was, and given the choice, you should play that one rather than this one. But it's still worth picking up and playing, especially if you love Lego, have younger children who need something to keep them busy in the car, or generally lean towards cute rather than blood-soaked." Peter Nowak of The Globe and Mail gave it a similar score of seven out of ten, saying, "The repetition turns tedious when the goon fights take place almost every step of the way. These fights are not challenging in the least – even to kids – with McCain merely tossing the bad guys around for a while before cuffing them. I won some of the fights without even looking at the screen." Liam Martin of Digital Spy gave it 3 out of 5 stars, commenting on the game's lack of appeal but praising the game's visuals and stating that, "Unfortunately, where LEGO City Undercover referenced movies and used voice acting to great effect, hardware limitations have forced TT Fusion to keep spoken cutscenes to a minimum, something which ultimately detracts from the hilarity. Despite its flaws, LEGO City Undercover: The Chase Begins is a charming release, packed with diverse missions, mostly impressive visuals and a great cast of characters." Chad Sapieha of National Post gave it a score of 5.5 out of 10, saying, "If you imagined the Wii U's excellent Lego City Undercover and the Nintendo 3DS's Lego City Undercover: The Chase Begins as actor siblings, the former would be Alec Baldwin to the latter's Daniel...Not Stephen, and not even William...Daniel." However, Mike LeChevallier of Slant Magazine gave it two stars out of five, saying, "With a full-bodied hike in attention to detail, The Chase Begins could have been a satisfying alternative for Lego fans who haven't yet obtained a Wii U, or simply gamers who've been bellowing for a well-made 3DS addition to the franchise. Disappointingly, what they've been allotted is a tattered set of hand-me-down Lego blocks, mismatched and marked with the fingerpaint smudges of those who've grown up and moved on to Minecraft." David Jenkins of Metro gave it a score of three out of ten, saying, "The Wii U game was just a few flaws short of a minor classic, but this joyless companion piece is only a couple more problems shy of a complete disaster."

On 12 September 2013, Nintendo announced that the game has sold 264,000 units in North America. As of December 31, 2020, worldwide sales reached 2.04 million copies, making it the 32nd best-selling game for the Nintendo 3DS.

References

External links
 
 

2013 video games
3D platform games
City Undercover: The Chase Begins
Nintendo 3DS games
Nintendo 3DS-only games
Nintendo 3DS eShop games
Nintendo games
Open-world video games
Traveller's Tales games
Video game prequels
Video games about police officers
Video games developed in the United Kingdom
Video games set in 2011
Single-player video games